Edwin Phiri (born 17 September 1983) is a Zambian international footballer who last played for FK Kozara as a right back.

Career
Phiri has played club football in Zambia and Sweden for Chiparamba Great Eagles, Örgryte IS, Ljungskile SK and FC Trollhättan in 2011.

Phiri earned two international caps for Zambia in 2004, both of which came in FIFA World Cup qualifying matches.

References

1983 births
Living people
Zambian footballers
Zambia international footballers
Örgryte IS players
Ljungskile SK players
FC Trollhättan players
Allsvenskan players
Association football fullbacks
Zambian expatriate footballers
Expatriate footballers in Sweden
Zambian expatriate sportspeople in Sweden
Superettan players